Augustówka  is a village in the administrative district of Gmina Siemień, within Parczew County, Lublin Voivodeship, in eastern Poland.

The village has an approximate population of 100.

References

Villages in Parczew County